The women's épée event at the 2020 Summer Olympics took place on 24 July 2021 at the Makuhari Messe. 34 fencers from 18 nations competed.

The medals for the competition were presented by Giovanni Malagò, Italy; IOC Member, and the medalists' bouquets were presented by Donald Anthony Jr., United States; FIE Vice President.

Background
This will be the 7th appearance of the event, which has been held at every Summer Olympics since 1996.

The reigning Olympic champion is Emese Szász of Hungary. The reigning (2019) World Champion is Nathalie Moellhausen of Brazil.

Qualification

A National Olympic Committee (NOC) could enter up to 3 qualified fencers in the women's épée. Nations were limited to three fencers each from 1996 to 2004. However, the 2008 Games introduced a rotation of women's team fencing events with one weapon left off each Games; the individual event without a corresponding team event had the number of fencers per nation reduced to two. Women's épée was the first event this applied to, so each nation could enter a maximum of two fencers in the event in 2008. The 2020 Games eliminated this rotation and all weapons had team events.

There are 34 dedicated quota spots for women's épée. The first 24 spots go to the 3 members of each of the 8 qualified teams in the team épée event (China, Poland, ROC, South Korea, Hong Kong, United States, Italy, and Estonia). Next, 6 more fencers are selected from the world rankings based on continents: 2 from Europe, 1 from the Americas, 2 from Asia/Oceania, and 1 from Africa. Finally, 4 spots are allocated by continental qualifying events: 1 from Europe, 1 from the Americas, 1 from Asia/Oceania, and 1 from Africa. Each nation can earn only one spot through rankings or events.

Additionally, there are 8 host/invitational spots that can be spread throughout the various fencing events. Japan qualified one fencer through normal qualification, but used no host quota places in women's épée.

The COVID-19 pandemic delayed many of the events for qualifying for fencing, moving the close of the rankings period back to April 5, 2021 rather than the original April 4, 2020.

Competition format
The 1996 tournament had vastly simplified the competition format for individual fencing competitions into a single-elimination bracket, with a bronze medal match. The 2020 tournament will continue to use that format. Fencing is done to 15 touches or to the completion of three three-minute rounds if neither fencer reaches 15 touches by then. At the end of time, the higher-scoring fencer is the winner; a tie results in an additional one-minute sudden-death time period. This sudden-death period is further modified by the selection of a draw-winner beforehand; if neither fencer scores a touch during the minute, the predetermined draw-winner wins the bout. Standard épée rules regarding target area, striking, and priority are used.

Schedule
The competition is held over a single day, Saturday, 24 July. The first session runs from 9 a.m. to approximately 4:20 p.m. (when the quarterfinals are expected to conclude), after which there is a break until 6 p.m. before the semifinals and medal bouts are held. Women's épée bouts alternate with the men's sabre event bouts.

All times are Japan Standard Time (UTC+9)

Results

Finals

Top half

Section 1

Section 2

Bottom half

Section 3

Red Piste

References

External links
Draw 

Women's épée
Women's events at the 2020 Summer Olympics
2021 in women's fencing